Kurokami: The Animation is an anime series adapted from the manga of the same title originally published by Square Enix and serialized in Young Gangan. Produced by Sunrise and directed by directed by Tsuneo Kobayashi, the series had an advance screening of episode 1 on December 27, 2008 before it began broadcasting on TV Asahi on January 8, 2009. The anime's opening song "Sympathizer" is sung by Minami Kuribayashi and the ending song "Irodori no Nai Sekai" by Yōsei Teikoku with the second opening song "tRANCE" done by GRANRODEO. The second ending song "Gekkou no Chigiri"  is also sung by Yōsei Teikoku also.

The show centers on Keita Ibuki, who is portrayed as a high school student instead of a computer programmer from the manga, being drawn in a secret conflict concerning the Mototsumitamas. Together with Kuro and Akane, Keita tries to find out why his mother died after seeing her double and find out who wants to destabilize the coexistence balance on Earth.

Word of an anime adaptation of Black God came from Young Gangan's 20th issue with the announcement regarding the creation of Kurokami: The Animation. A promotional video of Kurokami: The Animation was broadcast on the internet. Bandai Entertainment announced that Kurokami: The Animation was officially licensed in North America, and would air first on January 8, 2009 simultaneously in Japan on TV Asahi and in the United States on ImaginAsian, followed by South Korea on January 9, 2009 on AniBOX. Also on May 18, Bandai Entertainment uploaded onto YouTube and Crunchyroll the first 19 episodes as well as the special in English Dubbed form. Later episodes were episode on a week-by-week basis; the entire series is currently available to watch online on YouTube.

In the 2009 Comic-Con convention, Bandai has announced that Kurokami will see a Blu-ray release aside from DVD.

Episodes

Season 1

Season 2

References
 General
 

 Specific

External links
 Official Kurokami: The Animation Site 
 Official Kurokami: The Animation Site 

Kurokami